Santoshi Maa, is an Indian television mythological series, which premiered on &TV from 30 November 2015 until 20 October 2017. The series is produced by Rashmi Sharma Telefilms. Gracy Singh plays the titular role in the series, described as "an emblem of love, contentment, forgiveness, happiness and hope".

Plot

The show is a blend of mythology and drama. The story runs on three parallel tracks.

The first story is about Santoshi, a devout follower of Santoshi Maa who believes that the goddess is the ultimate cure for all miseries.

The second story depicts the story of Devloka where all the gods and goddesses of the Universe reside. Goddess Santoshi along with her alliance 'Gau Mata' try their best to help their devotees. Their attempts are often interrupted by Goddess Poulomi who is known to be the goddess of jealousy, greed, and deception.

The third track involves Santoshi's relatives who are extremely greedy by nature. They dream of becoming rich and can go to any extent to raise money and live a luxurious lifestyle. Santoshi's parents died because of evil Goddess Poulomi. Santoshi eldest grandmother and two children were cruel to Santoshi. When Santoshi grew up, she married a rich man.

Cast

Main 

 Gracy Singh as Santoshi Mata / Sadhvi Maa
 Ratan Rajput as Santoshi Dhairya Mishra (née Tripathi)
Sayantani Ghosh / Debina Bonerjee as Poulomi Maa aka Trishna
 Ayaz Ahmed as Dhairya Raghavendra Mishra

Recurring
 Upasana Singh as Madhu Pratap Mishra (2015–2016)
 Parikshit Sahni as Raghavendra Mishra (2015–2017)
 Kiran Janjani as Ujjwal Mishra (2015–2016)

Ahmad Harhash as Varun Mishra he is the son of Raghavendra (2015_2017)
 Omkar Das Manikpuri as Jagannath 
 Sadhana Singh as Vidya Raghavendra Mishra 
 Rahul Ranaa as Nagakaimasur
 Sonia Sahni as Dadi 
 Sunita Rajwar as Daksha 
 K C Shankar as Sheshnath
 Harshita Shukla as Madhuri
 Vijay Badlani as Narada
 Shiju Kataria as Laxmi Mata 
 Smriti Khanna as Parvati Mata 
 Shahbaz Khan as Pratap Raghavendra Mishra 
Chandni Bhagwanani as Riya 
Abhishek Bajaj as Sanket 
Teejay Sidhu as Nupur Ujwal Mishra 
Piyali Munshi / Taraka Pednekar / Jheel Mehta as Saraswati Mata
Kashvi Kothari as Child Santoshi                     
Guddu Maruti as shashi kala
Shabaaz Abdullah Badi as shashikala Nephew Rajan
Meghan Jadhav as Shashikala Nephew chintu
Shagun Pandey as Guddu
Aishana Singh / Jyotsna Chandola as Bitto
 Priyamvada Kant as Sharmeeli (2016–2017)
 Kamalika Guha Thakurta as Kamini (2017)
 Harbandana Kaur as Rudrakshi Dhairya Mishra
 Kushank Arora as Ankur Pratap Mishra
 Archana Taide as Sindoori / Fake Santoshi (2016)
 Tarun Khanna as Shiva 
 Soni Singh as Swarnarekha (2016)
 Aanchal Khurana as Bubbly Tiwari  (2016)
 Aryan Vaid / Aarya Dharamchand Kumar as Indra (2016–2017) / (2017)
 Tasheen Shah as Poulomika (Trishna's daughter) 
 Alka Kaushal / Deepshikha Nagpal as Kranti Maa (2017) / (2017)
 Nasirr Khan as Kumbhak

Special Appearance
Juhi Parmar as Riddhima (Santoshi's Mother) 
Sachin Shroff as Vinayak (Santoshi's Father)

Guest appearance
Sara Khan as Anju (2016)
Ankit Gera as Nikhil (2016)
Arti Singh 
Aditi Dev Sharma as Gangaa from (Gangaa) (2016)

Dubbed versions

References

External links
 

2015 Indian television series debuts
Hindi-language television shows
Indian television series about Hindu deities
Indian television soap operas
&TV original programming
2017 Indian television series endings